The Arrow was a cyclecar marketed as a light car manufactured in M.C. Whitmore Co, Dayton, Ohio, in 1914.  The Arrow had a four-cylinder,1 ½ liter water-cooled engine, and sold for $395.

References
Notes

Bibliography
 

Cyclecars
Defunct motor vehicle manufacturers of the United States
Motor vehicle manufacturers based in Ohio
Defunct companies based in Dayton, Ohio